6cyclemind (sometimes spelled as Six Cycle Mind, 6 Cycle Mind, 6CycleMind or 6Cyclemind) is a Filipino rock band composed of Tito Fortunato "Tutti" Caringal II on vocals, Ryan "Rye" Sarmiento on rhythm and lead guitars and backing vocals, Roberto "Bob" Cañamo on bass guitar and backing vocals, Herbert Hernandez on lead guitars and Vic Aquino on drums.

The band's music is a fusion of alternative and pop music. The band gained a mainstream exposure in the early 2000s and was a prominent fixture of the Tunog Kalye era.

History
The group has released five studio albums under Sony Music Philippines: Permission to Shine (2003), Panorama (2005), Home (2007), Fiesta! Magsasaya Ang Lahat (2007), and Project: 6cyclemind (2009).

They previously performed for the Tanduay's "First Five", along with Rico Blanco (2009), Kamikazee, Chicosci, Sandwich and Bamboo (2010).

The band was the endorser of Suzuki for two consecutive years after 2010. Through the Suzuki Invasion tour, they performed their hits in different parts of the country on those years.

In 2011, lead vocalist Ney Dimaculangan went on hiatus to pursue other musical endeavors but eventually pursued a solo career and later fronted his namesake band citing "burnout" as primary reason. Drummer Tutti Caringal replaced him as the lead vocalist.

In 2015, lead vocalist Tutti Caringal, who won as councilor in the 2013 elections in Cabuyao, Laguna, temporarily went on hiatus due to his candidacy as a candidate for the 2016 elections. He won the said elections and won again in the 2019 elections. He remains active in both of his political and band duties. Caringal came from a family of armies.

Lead guitarist Herbert Hernandez went on to become an award winning Advertising Executive and Creative Director. He co-founded the agency GIGIL.

Name origin
The name "6cyclemind" comes from the five members plus their manager, Darwin Hernandez of Soupstar Entertainment. Collectively, they all contribute to composing, arranging and brainstorming, which is a continuous cycle in their creation of music, hence 6cyclemind.

Carlos "Chuck" Isidro was the former lead guitarist for Afterimage. When Afterimage disbanded, Isidro worked in the recording company. During his stay, he signed up a group managed by Darwin Hernandez where he met Ryan "Rye" Sarmiento, Roberto "Bob" Cañamo, Gilbert "Gibbz" Magat and Rhoneil "Ney" Dimaculangan. Isidro and Hernandez agreed to form a band with them, which became 6cyclemind. Magat was then later replaced by Tutti Caringal of the band Protein Shake.

Members

Tutti Caringal – lead vocals (2011–present); formerly drums and backing vocals (2001–2011)
Rye Sarmiento – rhythm and lead guitar, backing vocals (2001–present)
Bob Cañamo – bass guitar (2001–present); backing vocals (2011–present)
Herbert Hernandez – lead guitar (2010–present)
Vic Aquino – drums (2011–present)

Touring Substisute 
 Berns Cuevas – rhythm and lead guitar, bass guitar, backing vocals
 Daniel Paringit – lead and rhythm guitar, backing vocals
 Raffy Bonifacio - drums

Former members
Gilbert "Gibbz" Magat – drums (2001)
Chuck Isidro – lead guitar (2001–2010)
Ney Dimaculangan – lead vocals (2001–2011; currently performing as vocalist of his namesake band)

Discography

Studio albums

Compilation albums
Ultraelectromagneticjam!: The Music Of The Eraserheads (Sony Music, 2005)
The Best Of Manila Sound: Hopia Mani Popcorn (Viva Records, 2006)
Gusto Ko Ng Rock (Sony Music, 2009)
Tambayan 101.9 (Star Music, 2009)
Sakto Sa Pasko (Sony Music, 2009)
The Reunion Soundtrack (Star Music, 2012)

Soundtracks
When I Met U: Original Motion Picture Soundtrack (Sony Music, 2009)
BFGF: Music From Original TV Soundtrack (Sony Music, 2010)
Smart (Saludo, 2010)

Awards and nominations

References 

Filipino rock music groups
Musical groups from Metro Manila
Musical groups established in 2001
Sony Music Philippines artists